The members of the 38th Manitoba Legislature were elected in the Manitoba general election held in June 2003. The legislature sat from June 23, 2003 to April 20, 2007.

The New Democratic Party led by Gary Doer formed the government.

Stuart Murray of the Progressive Conservative Party was Leader of the Opposition. Hugh McFadyen was elected party leader in 2006 after Murray resigned in November 2005.

George Hickes served as speaker for the assembly.

There were five sessions of the 38th Legislature:

Peter Liba was Lieutenant Governor of Manitoba until June 30, 2004, when John Harvard became lieutenant governor.

Members of the Assembly 
The following members were elected to the assembly in 2003:

Notes:

By-elections 
By-elections were held to replace members for various reasons:

Notes:

References 

Terms of the Manitoba Legislature
2003 establishments in Manitoba
2007 disestablishments in Manitoba